is a Japanese footballer who plays for Matsumoto Yamaga FC.

Club statistics
Updated to end of 2019 season.

1includes J1/J2 play-offs.

References

External links
 Profile at Ventforet Kofu
 
 
 
 Profile at Mito HollyHock

1990 births
Living people
Chukyo University alumni
Association football people from Gifu Prefecture
Japanese footballers
J2 League players
J3 League players
Japan Football League players
Zweigen Kanazawa players
Mito HollyHock players
Ventforet Kofu players
Oita Trinita players
Matsumoto Yamaga FC players
Association football midfielders